Eye on the Horizon is the sixth studio album by the British band Dreadzone. It was released on 26 April 2010 through Dubwiser records.

Track listing 
All tracks written by  Spencer Graham, Greg Roberts and Earl Daley

"Tomorrow Never Comes"
"For A Reason"
"Changes"
"American Dread"
"Beyond A Rock"
"Gangster"
"Yeah Man"
"My Face"
"Walk Tall"
"Just Let Go"

Personnel 
MC Spee (Spencer Graham) - vocals
Earl 16 - vocals
Greg Dread - drum programming, keyboards, producer, electronics
Leo Williams - bass guitar
Chris Compton - guitar
Chris Oldfield - electronics (Apple Mac), effects
with:
Marlon Roberts - keyboards
Tim Bran - additional keyboards
Steve Roberts - guitar on "American Dread"
Marcina Arnold - vocals on "Changes" and "Just Let Go"
Sweetie Irie (Dean Bent) - vocals on "Yeah Man"

References

2010 albums
Dreadzone albums